Paweł Łukaszka (born February 6, 1962) is a former Polish ice hockey goaltender. He played for the Poland men's national ice hockey team at 1980 Winter Olympics in Lake Placid.

References

1962 births
Living people
Ice hockey players at the 1980 Winter Olympics
Olympic ice hockey players of Poland
People from Nowy Targ
Polish ice hockey goaltenders
Podhale Nowy Targ players
Sportspeople from Lesser Poland Voivodeship